The Oceania Youth Athletics Championships is an athletics event organized by the Oceania Athletics Association (OAA) open for youth (U18) athletes from member and associate member associations.  The competition is held biennially for the first time in 1993 until 1999, and between 2000 and 2008 together with the Oceania Open Championships.  In 2010 and 2011, it was held together with the Australian Junior Athletics Championships (U14 to U20), and in 2013 again together with the Oceania Open Championships.

Editions

Championships records

Boys

Girls

References
General
Oceania Championships records 23 July 2019 updated
Specific

External links
OAA website

 
Under-18 athletics competitions
Recurring sporting events established in 1993
Youth
Continental athletics championships
Biennial athletics competitions